The 2018–19 Grand Prix of Figure Skating Final and ISU Junior Grand Prix Final  took place from 6 to 9 December 2018 at the Doug Mitchell Thunderbird Sports Centre in Vancouver, British Columbia, Canada. The combined event was the culmination of two international series — the Grand Prix of Figure Skating and the Junior Grand Prix. Medals were awarded in the disciplines of men's singles, ladies' singles, pair skating, and ice dancing on the senior and junior levels.

Schedule 
Listed in local time (UTC−8)

Wednesday, December 5, 2018
 Official practices (all day)

Thursday, December 6, 2018
 14:05 – Junior dance: rhythm dance
 15:20 – Junior men: short program
 16:25 – Junior pairs: short program
 17:40 – Junior ladies: short program
 19:00 – Opening ceremony
 19:45 – Senior men: short program
 21:00 – Senior ladies: short program

Friday, December 7, 2018
 15:45 – Junior dance: free dance
 17:05 – Junior men: free skating
 Victory ceremonies – junior men, junior ice dance
 19:05 – Senior dance: rhythm dance
 20:20 – Senior pairs: short program
 21:35 – Senior men: free skating
 Victory ceremony – senior men

Saturday, December 8, 2018
 13:55 – Senior ladies: free skating
 15:15 – Junior ladies: free skating
 16:30 – Junior pairs: free skating
 Victory ceremonies – junior pairs, senior ladies, junior ladies
 19:00 – Senior dance: free dance
 20:20 – Senior pairs: free skating
 Victory ceremonies – senior pairs, senior ice dance

Sunday, December 9, 2018
 14:00 – Exhibition gala

Qualifiers

Senior-level qualifiers

Junior-level qualifiers

Changes to preliminary qualifiers

Records 

The following new ISU best scores were set during this competition:

Medalists

Senior

Junior

Medals table

Overall

Senior

Junior

Senior-level results

Men

Ladies

Pairs

Ice dancing

Junior-level results

Men

Ladies

Pairs

Ice dancing

References 

Grand Prix of Figure Skating Final
ISU Junior Grand Prix
International figure skating competitions hosted by Canada
Grand Prix of Figure Skating
Grand Prix of Figure Skating
Grand Prix of Figure Skating
Grand Prix of Figure Skating